Parit Andin 3 is a village in Parit Yaani, Batu Pahat District, Johor, Malaysia. The village is occupied by 200 people from 50 families. Many of the villagers are farmers of rubber tapper or palm trees. The younger generation usually works at factories in Tongkang Pechah, Parit Yaani, or Batu Pahat.

The other village near Parit Andin 3 are Parit Yob, Parit Lintang, Parit Tengah dan Parit Hitam. To get to Parit Andin 3, you can exit from Toll Yong Peng and headed to Muar. Then take left in the traffic light in Parit Yaani. After that go straight again until you see masjid Parit Yob and then turn left. Then take right when you see small bridge that have sign Parit Andin 3.

Batu Pahat District
Villages in Johor